Phloeidae is a family of true bugs belonging to the order Hemiptera.

Genera:
 Heteropteropsis Kumar & Mathur, 2007
 Palaeophloea Kirkaldy, 1909 
 Phloea Lepeletier & Audinet-Serville, 1825

References

Heteroptera
Heteroptera families